Pir Gari (also Romanized as Pīr Gārī; also known as Pīr Goori and Pīr Gūrī) is a village in Shahid Modarres Rural District, in the Central District of Shushtar County, Khuzestan Province, Iran. At the 2006 census, its population was 359, in 79 families.

References 

Populated places in Shushtar County